Mbiganyi Thee (born 26 May 1962) is a retired athlete from Botswana who specialised in the middle-distance events. He represented his country at the 1988 and 1992 Summer Olympics, as well as two outdoor and four indoor World Championships.

Competition record

Personal bests
Outdoor
800 metres – 1:45.94 (Tokyo 1991)
1000 metres – 2:19.19 (Auckland 1990) NR
1500 metres – 3:40.60 (London 1991)
Indoor
800 metres – 1:48.95 (Toronto 1993)
1500 metres – 3:44.33 (Indianapolis 1987) NR

References

External links
 

1962 births
Living people
Botswana male middle-distance runners
Olympic athletes of Botswana
Athletes (track and field) at the 1988 Summer Olympics
Athletes (track and field) at the 1992 Summer Olympics
Commonwealth Games competitors for Botswana
Athletes (track and field) at the 1986 Commonwealth Games
Athletes (track and field) at the 1990 Commonwealth Games
World Athletics Championships athletes for Botswana